Hurricane Kenneth was the strongest and longest-tracked hurricane of the 2005 Pacific hurricane season. The eleventh named storm and fifth hurricane of the season, Kenneth developed from a disturbance in the Intertropical Convergence Zone to the southwest of Mexico on September 14. After weakening to tropical storm status, Kenneth attained a steady west-northwest motion and encountered favorable enough conditions for it to gain power and attain hurricane status on September 25. The cyclone again weakened as its motion halted, and on September 30 Kenneth dissipated a short distance off the Big Island of Hawaii. The rainfall caused flooding, though no major damage was reported.

Meteorological history

The origins of Kenneth are believed to have been from a tropical wave that crossed Central America into the eastern North Pacific Ocean on September 9. The system tracked westward within the Intertropical Convergence Zone — a belt of thunderstorm activity across the eastern Pacific Ocean — and on September 13 its associated thunderstorm activity began showing signs of organization. The depression maintained a general westward track throughout its entire duration, due to the subtropical ridge to its north.

Initially, the depression was forecast to reach maximum strength as a tropical storm before weakening, and only the Geophysical Fluid Dynamics Laboratory's hurricane model predicted it to attain hurricane status. However, low amounts of wind shear and warm sea surface temperatures favored further intensification. After being previously removed from the primary thunderstorm activity, the circulation became situated beneath a persistent area of deep convection. It is estimated the cyclone intensified into Tropical Storm Kenneth early on September 15. The storm quickly developed banding features—spiral rain showers of convection—as its convection formed into a central area of deep convection. These were all signs for further development, and Kenneth attained hurricane status early on September 16. By September 17, the hurricane had finished an eyewall replacement cycle, meaning its original eye was replaced by a larger, better defined eye. As a result, it quickly intensified and attained major hurricane status.

After maintaining peak strength for about 18 hours, Kenneth began a sharp weakening trend due to unfavorable north-northeasterly wind shear; this was caused by the anticyclone over Hurricane Jova, which eroded the eyewall of Hurricane Kenneth. While weakening, the hurricane turned to a southwest drift, due to a weakness in steering currents. By September 20, its deepest convection was confined to the southern half of the hurricane, and later in the day Kenneth weakened to tropical storm status. Reduced moisture in the atmosphere weakened the system further, and by September 21 its circulation was exposed to the east-northeast of the convection. Kenneth began a steady west-northwest track due to a weak ridge to its north. Operationally the storm was predicted to continue weakening and dissipate within four days. However, deep convection re-developed near the center as the outflow became better defined, and Kenneth remained a moderate tropical storm for several days. On September 24, the motion became nearly stationary as steering currents again weakened. Vertical shear sharply declined, allowing the convection to become more symmetrical and for an eye feature to develop.

Hurricane Kenneth maintained minimal hurricane status for about 30 hours as it drifted southwestward, during which it entered the area of responsibility of the Central Pacific Hurricane Center. Increasing shear weakened Kenneth to tropical storm status on September 26, and it began a steady northwest track under the influence of low- to mid-level steering flow. By September 27, most of its convection had dissipated, excluding a small area of thunderstorms to the southeast of the center. Convection intermittently reformed near the center, though the combination of wind shear and cooler water temperatures prevented restrengthening. On September 29, an intensifying upper-level trough over the Hawaiian Islands weakened Kenneth to tropical depression status. A remnant swirl of clouds later moved onshore of the Big Island.

Impact and aftermath

The remnants of Kenneth produced rainfall in the Hawaiian Islands when they interacted with an upper-level trough, causing some reports of flash flooding. On October 1, rains caused the Kaukonahua Stream to burst its banks and Lake Wilson to overflow behind the Wahiawa Dam.

Flash flooding occurred on the Hanalei River, which resulted in the closure of the Kuhio Highway at the Hanalei Bridge. Rapid water level rises also occurred on the Wailua River and the Hanapepe River, though no significant damages were reported along these waterways.

Large swells churned up by Kenneth generated surf of  that crashed ashore on September 30 along the east shores of the islands of Hawaii, Kauai, Molokai, Maui, and Oahu. No reports of injuries or serious damage were received.

During the 61st Interdepartmental Hurricane Conference, the Hawaii State Civil Defense requested the retirement of the name Kenneth, citing that the storm had become memorable due to threat or damage. However, the World Meteorological Organization did not approve the request, and the name was reused for the 2011 season.

See also

 List of Hawaii hurricanes
 Other tropical cyclones of the same name
 List of Category 4 Pacific hurricanes

References

Kenneth
Kenneth (2005)
Kenneth (2005)
2005 in Hawaii
Kenneth